Mellado is a surname. Notable people with the surname include:

Alba Mellado (born 1992), Spanish football (soccer) player
Edith Mellado Céspedes (born 1938), Peruvian politician and educator
Francisco de Paula Mellado, Spanish geographer who published the Enciclopedia moderna between 1851 and 1855
Gaby Mellado (born 1992), Mexican television actress
Galindo Mellado Cruz (1973–2014), known as "El Mellado", Mexican suspected drug lord, co-founder of Los Zetas
Héctor Mellado (1925–2007), Chilean cyclist
Iván Vázquez Mellado (born 1982), nickname "El Terrible", Mexican football (soccer) player
Manuel Gutiérrez Mellado (1912–1995), Spanish Army officer, Honorary Captain General, 1st Minister of Defence in Spain
Mario Mellado García (died 2014), Mexican lawyer, politician and judge
Marisol Vazquez-Mellado Mollon, director of finance and administration for Médica Sur
Miguel Mellado (born 1993), Argentine football (soccer) player
Ramón Mellado Parsons (1904–1985), Puerto Rican educator, writer and politician
Santiago Mellado (born 1963), President and CEO of Compassion International, a Christian child sponsorship organization

See also
Mella (disambiguation)
Mello (disambiguation)

Surnames of Spanish origin